Ijeoma Uchegbu is a Nigerian-British Professor of Pharmacy at University College London where she held the position of Pro-Vice Provost for Africa and the Middle East. She is the Chief Scientific Officer of Nanomerics, a pharmaceutical nanotechnology company specialising in drug delivery solutions for poorly water-soluble drugs, nucleic acids and peptides. She is also a Governor of the Wellcome, a large biomedical research charity. 
Apart from her highly cited scientific research in Pharmaceutical Nanoscience, Uchegbu is also known for her work in science public engagement and equality and diversity in Science, Technology, Engineering and Mathematics (STEM).

Education and early career 
Uchegbu grew up in Hackney and South East Nigeria. She studied pharmacy at the University of Benin, graduating in 1981, and earned her master's degree at the University of Lagos. She could not complete a PhD in Nigeria due to infrastructure difficulties. She moved back to the UK and completed her postgraduate studies at the University of London, graduating with a PhD in 1997. She was supervised by Alexander (Sandy) Florence, Dean of the School of Pharmacy. She was appointed a lecturer at the University of Strathclyde from 2002-2004.

Research 
Uchegbu was made a Chair in Drug Delivery at the University of Strathclyde in 2002. Here she worked on polymer self-assembly, identifying materials that could form stable nanosystems. She demonstrated that polymer molecular weight could be used to control the size of vesicles. She joined University College London in 2006 as a Chair in Pharmaceutical Nanoscience at the School of Pharmacy. Uchegbu leads a research group that investigate molecular design and dosage of pharmaceuticals. She has designed polymers that self-assemble into nanoparticles with the appropriate properties to transport drugs. She explores how nanoparticles can be used for drug delivery. Uchegbu holds several patents for drug delivery, and biocompatible polymers. Her pharmaceuticals deliver genes and siRNA to tumours and peptides to the brain as well as encouraging the absorption of hydrophobic drugs using nanoparticles. She is exploring how nanomedicine can be used to treat brain tumours. In 2018 she was part of a £5.7 million Engineering and Physical Sciences Research Council grant, Raman Nanotheranostics, that will use gold nanoparticles to identify disease and light to destroy diseased cells. She also works with magnetic nanoparticles.

Nanomerics 
In 2010 Uchegbu founded Nanomerics with Andreas Schätzlein. Nanomerics is a pharmaceutical company that uses nanotechnology platforms to develop medicine. Uchegbu is the Chief Scientific Officer of Nanomerics. Nanomerics are developing structures that can transport antibodies that can cross the blood–brain barrier. Nanomerics develop molecular envelope technology nanoparticles from amphiphilic polymers that self-assemble. She won the Royal Society of Chemistry Emerging Technologies prize for their molecular envelope technology in 2017. She licensed the medicine NM133 to Iacta Pharmaceuticals in 2017. NM133 contains cyclosporine A and can be used to treat dry eye.

Professional service 
Uchegbu serves on the editorial board of the Journal of Controlled Release. She has served as the scientific secretary of the Controlled Release Society. She is editor-in-chief of Pharmaceutical Nanotechnology. She is on the healthcare strategy advisory team of the Engineering and Physical Sciences Research Council. She was involved in the University College London celebrations of the National Health Service turning seventy. In 2007 she was chosen for Women of Outstanding Achievement in SET Photographic Exhibition which was displayed at the Science Museum and the British Museum.

In 2015 Uchegbu was appointed Pro-Vice Provost for Africa and the Middle East. She chairs the Africa and Middle East regional network at University College London, building partnerships and starting collaborative teams, welcoming international visitors and supporting student recruitment.

Public Engagement and Equality and Diversity 
Uchegbu is involved in public engagement and science communication and is featured in BBC Woman's Hour discussing her research into how nano particles can be used to help deliver drugs to the body and taken part in Soapbox Science an international science outreach programme promoting women scientists and the work they do to members of the public.

Uchegbu is also involved in equality and diversity activities and programmes, acting as the UCL Provost's Envoy for Race Equality and featuring as the only Black British Role Model for the Women's Engineering Society. She also serves on the University College London Race Equality Charter self-assessment team. She is part of the Black Female Professors Forum, representing 1 of the 55 female professors of colour and 1 of the 25 Black female professors in the UK in 2017.

Books 

 2000 Synthetic Surfactant Vesicles: Niosomes and Other Non-phospholipid Vesicular Systems: 11 (Drug Targeting and Delivery)
 2006 Polymers in Drug Delivery
 2013 Fundamentals of Pharmaceutical Nanoscience

Awards and honours 

 2007 UK Department for Business, Innovation and Skills Women of Outstanding Achievement in Science Engineering and Technology
 2012 Royal Pharmaceutical Society Pharmaceutical Scientist of the Year
 2013 Academy of Pharmaceutical Sciences Eminent Fellow
 2013 Controlled Release Society College of Fellows
 2016 Academy of Pharmaceutical Sciences Innovative Science Award

References 

Nigerian scientists
Academics of University College London
Academics of the University of Strathclyde
University of Benin (Nigeria) alumni
University of Lagos alumni
Year of birth missing (living people)
Living people